is the first television special in the Lupin III franchise. Directed by veteran director Osamu Dezaki, it was broadcast by NTV on April 1, 1989. A number of Lupin III television specials have followed with a total of 28 airing as of November 2019, including a crossover special with Detective Conan.

Plot
Lupin is forced to give up his life of crime when he encounters Michael, a young boy who demonstrates that police computers are able to predict his every move. His retirement is short-lived when his colleague Jigen learns the location of the giant diamond called the Super Egg which was stolen from the Three Masons, a sinister secret society. The Egg is hidden in the Statue of Liberty and Lupin helps recover the diamond by stealing the entire Statue. Meanwhile, Goemon becomes bodyguard to Isabelle, a beautiful woman who is also seeking the Super Egg. It transpires that Michael is the son of the women, Isabelle Silverman, Number 2 of the Masons and a computer scientist who invented the Neovirus. She conspires with Jimmy, Number 3, to get the Super Egg and kill number 1 to take over the Masons. However, once they have the egg, Jimmy fatally stabs Isabelle and releases the Neovirus. The virus causes the US and USSR to prepare their nuclear missiles for launch, but Lupin helps Michael to halt the computer program and avert a global disaster.

Voice cast

Production
The special was directed by Osamu Dezaki, an experienced anime director who had previously storyboarded several episodes of Lupin The Third Part I. In addition Dezaki created the storyboards under the pseudonym Makura Saki, something he commonly did despite being well known for creating his own storyboards.

During his career Dezaki created many animation techniques that became standard in the Japanese animation industry and are used throughout the special. One of his best known techniques "Postcard memories", also commonly known as "Harmony" involved adding painted lines to a cel to give the appearance of a watercolor effect and provide visual impact with minimal animation. While this technique is normally used to end a scene, during the special it is also used during action scenes. Another signature technique used during the special is the "triple take" where a cel is moved quickly across the camera multiple times to produce a sense of speed. The name comes from its typical usage of 3 passes of the cel. Lighting techniques used techniques include backlit backgrounds, gel effects, lighting bloom in the corner of a scene and diagonal spotlights across heavily shadowed images to produce a sense of darkness. other techniques include Parallax scrolling to give depth to city scenes, split screens and dutch angle.

Release
Bye, Bye Lady Liberty was broadcast on April 4, 1989.

VAP have published several home releases of the special in Japan. At first the special was released as both a VHS and a Laserdisc edition. They then released the special on DVD on December 22, 1999 and again in April 2006. A DVD containing both Liberty and the next special, Hemingway Papers was released by Futabasha on July 4, 2014. The soundtrack was released on October 21, 2000.

Manga Entertainment UK released an English dubbed VHS as Goodbye Lady Liberty in the United Kingdom on 9 September 1996.
Discotek Media released the special on DVD in North America as Bye Bye Lady Liberty on March 25, 2014.

Reception
In 500 Essential Anime Movies, Helen McCarthy called Liberty her personal favourite of the Lupin TV specials. She describes it as "light, funny and entertaining" and "terrific entertainment". Reviewing Liberty for Manga Mania, John Spencer felt it was a "rather routine television movie, with none of the flair and style of the previous films". He compares the secrecy of one of the characters to Scooby-Doo and in summary describes the film as "not classic Lupin...but good enough". Lupin expert Reed Nelson expressed that although Liberty is superior to several of the specials that followed it, it suffers from uneven pacing and a climax comparable to The Mystery of Mamo.

Writing for The Fandom Post, Darius Washington noted the techniques used by Dezaki on Golgo 13: The Professional worked well with the special. He called the UK dub "solid" with the exception of one scene and highlighted the special as one of the better feature length entries in the series.

Notes

References

External links
 Lupin III Encyclopedia
 
 

Anime television films
Lupin the Third
TMS Entertainment
Discotek Media
Films set in 1989
Films set in New York City
1989 anime films
Films directed by Osamu Dezaki